The Bücker Bü 182 Kornett ("Ensign") was a single-seat advanced trainer developed in Germany for Luftwaffe service shortly before the outbreak of World War II.

A single-seat low-wing cantilever monoplane, it was intended to give student pilots some experience with an aircraft with performance approaching that of a contemporary fighter, and could carry practice bombs. Production was shelved at the outbreak of war, and only about four examples were ever constructed, all of them destroyed around 1943.

Development 
The last aircraft designed by Anderson, the Bü 182 Kornett, of which only three were built, found no support in the Air Ministry of the Reich, even though it combined technical progress and low-cost. The Bü 182 Kornett was a highly innovative model, fitted with a low-priced high-performance engine, that would have made a good trainer for the Luftwaffe.

Specifications (Bü 182C)

See also

References

Citations

Bibliography
 König, Erwin. Die Bücker-Flugzeuge (The Bücker Aircraft) (bilingual German/English). Martinsried, Germany: Nara Verlag, 1987. .
 König, Erwin. Die Bückers, Die Geschichte der ehemaligen Bücker-Flugzeugbau-GmbH und ihrer Flugzeuge (in German). (1979)
 Nowarra, Heinz J. Die Deutsche Luftrüstung 1933-1945 (in German). Koblenz, Germany: Bernard & Graeffe Verlag, 1993. .
 Taylor, J.H. Jane's Encyclopedia of Aviation. London: Studio Editions, 1989.
 Wietstruk, Siegfried. Bücker-Flugzeugbau, Die Geschichte eines Flugzeugwerkes (in German). D-82041 Oberhaching, Germany: Aviatik Verlag, 1999. .

External links

1930s German military trainer aircraft
Bücker aircraft